The Penal Servitude Act 1864 is an act of the Parliament of the United Kingdom. The act amended the Penal Servitude Act 1853 and the Penal Servitude Act 1857. The act received Royal Assent on 25 July 1864.

Provisions
The provisions of the act include:
Amending the former Acts to make the minimum sentence of penal servitude five years instead of three.
If one had already committed a felony, this was lengthened to seven years minimum sentence.

Gave the Secretary of State the power to order two or more Justices of the Peace to sentence offenders serving penal sentences to corporal punishment for offences they commit while in prison.

Allowed convicts to be freed by the issuing of a License. Such Licenses were forfeited if the convict was found guilty of another offence within the time period of their original sentence.

Making it an offence to not produce a License when asked by a Judge, Justice of the Peace, Sheriff, Sheriff Substitute or Magistrate or to break the terms of the License which by itself would not be a crime.
Making the sentence for such offences three months imprisonment, with or without hard labour.

Allowing a police officer to arrest without warrant any License holder who may be reasonably be suspected of committing a crime or of violating the terms of their License and detain them until they can be put before a magistrate and "dealt with according to the law.

Allowing two or more Justices in England or Ireland to rule on offences in this Act, in manners directed in Summary Jurisdiction Act 1848 (for England) and Petty Sessions (Ireland) Act 1851 (in Ireland).

Allowing any Sheriff, Sheriff Substitute, Magistrate or any two Justices in Scotland to rule on offences in this Act.

Making it the responsibility of whoever convicts the prisoner to notify the Secretary of State if the conviction is in England or Scotland or the Lord Lieutenant in Ireland.

Making prisoners whose Licenses have been revoked carry out the remainder of the term exempted by the License while serving any other sentence they might be subject to.

Gave the Crown, the Lord Lieutenant of Ireland and the Governor of Ireland the powers to give and revoke Licenses with amended terms "at pleasure".

Timeline
The Act had its second reading on 4 March 1864 and gained royal assent on 25 July 1864.

Repeal
Sections 2 and 6 of the Act (giving corporal punishments and arrest without warrant) were repealed by the Penal Servitude Act 1891.

References

United Kingdom Acts of Parliament 1864
Criminal law of the United Kingdom
1864 in British law
Penal system in the United Kingdom